The mass media in China primarily consists of television, newspapers, radio, and magazines. Since the start of the 21st century, the Internet has also emerged as an important form of mass media and is under the direct supervision and control of the Chinese government and ruling Chinese Communist Party (CCP). Media in China is strictly controlled by the CCP, with the main agency that oversees the nation's media being the Central Propaganda Department of the CCP. The largest media organizations, including the China Central Television, the People's Daily, and the Xinhua News Agency, are all controlled by the CCP.

Since the founding of the People's Republic of China in 1949 and until the 1980s, almost all media outlets in mainland China have been state-run. Privately owned media outlets only began to emerge at the onset of economic reforms, although state media continue to hold significant market share. All media continues to follow regulations imposed by the Central Propaganda Department of the CCP on subjects considered taboo by the CCP, including but not limited to the legitimacy of the Party, pro-democracy movements, human rights in Tibet, the Uyghur genocide, pornography, and the banned religious topics, such as the Dalai Lama and Falun Gong. Hong Kong, which has maintained a separate media ecosystem than mainland China, is also witnessing increasing self-censorship.

Reporters Without Borders consistently ranks China very poorly on media freedoms in their annual releases of the Press Freedom Index, labeling the Chinese government as having "the sorry distinction of leading the world in repression of the Internet". In 2021, China ranked 177 out of 180 nations on the Press Freedom Index.

History

Under Mao 
In both the Yan'an era of the 1930s and the early 1950s, the CCP encouraged grassroots journalism in the form "worker-peasant correspondents," an idea originating from the Soviet Union.

During the early period (1966-1968) of the Cultural Revolution, freedom of the press in China was at its peak. Independent political groups could publish broadsheets and handbills, as well as leaders' speeches and meeting transcripts which would normally have been considered highly classified. During those years, several Red Guard organizations operated independent printing presses to publish newspapers, articles, speeches, and big-character posters.

Reforms and opening up 
Media controls were most relaxed during the 1980s under paramount leader Deng Xiaoping, until they were tightened in the aftermath of the 1989 Tiananmen Square protests and massacre. Journalists were active participants in the 1989 demonstrations that culminated in the and the massacre made it all but impossible to reconcile the growing desire of mainland Chinese journalists for control over their own profession with the CCP's interest in not letting that happen. There have even been occasional acts of open, outright defiance of the CCP, though these acts remain rare.

Media controls were relaxed again under CCP general secretary Jiang Zemin in the late 1990s, but the growing influence of the Internet and its potential to encourage dissent led to heavier regulations again under CCP general secretary Hu Jintao. Non-governmental media outlets that were allowed to operate within China (excluding Hong Kong and Macau, which have separate media regulatory bodies) were no longer required to strictly follow every journalistic guideline set by the CCP.

In the 1990s and early 2000s, the ways in which the CCP operated—especially the introduction of reforms aimed at decentralizing power—spurred a period of greater media autonomy in several ways:

 The growth of "peripheral"—local and some regional—media. This trend decentralized and dampened CCP oversight. In general, the greater the distance is between reporters and media outlets, and Beijing and important provincial capitals, the greater their leeway.
 A shift toward administrative and legal regulation of the media and away from more fluid and personal oversight. CCP efforts to rely on regulations rather than whim to try to control the media—as evidenced by the dozens of directives set forth when the State Press and Publications Administration was created in 1987, and by new regulations in 1990 and 1994—probably were intended to tighten party control, making it a matter of law rather than personal relationships. In fact, however, these regulations came at a time when official resources were being stretched more thinly and individual officials were becoming less willing—and less able—to enforce regulations.
 Vicissitudes of media acceptability. Since the early 1990s, the types of media coverage deemed acceptable by the regime have risen sharply. Growing uncertainties about what is permissible and what is out of bounds sometimes work to the media's interests. Often, however, these uncertainties encourage greater self-censorship among Chinese journalists and work to the benefit of the CCP's media control apparatus.

As state resources have become stretched more thinly, the media have found it far easier than before to print and broadcast material that falls within vaguely defined grey areas, though again, this uncertainty can also work to the advantage of the CCP.

In preparation of the 17th National Party Congress in 2007, new restrictions were placed on all sectors of the press, Internet-users, bloggers, website managers, foreign journalist, more than 30 of which have been arrested since the start of the year. In addition, a thousand discussion forums and websites have been shut down, and "a score of dissidents" have been imprisoned since July 2007.

In efforts to stem growing unrest in China, the propaganda chief of the State Council, Hua Qing, announced in the People's Daily that the government was drafting a new press law that would lessen government involvement in the news media. In the editorial, Hu Jintao was said to have visited the People's Daily offices and said that large scale public incidents should be "accurately, objectively and uniformly reported, with no tardiness, deception, incompleteness or distortion". Recent reports by Chinese media indicate a gradual release from party control. For example, the detention of anti-government petitioners placed in mental institutions was reported in a state newspaper, later criticized in an editorial by the English-language China Daily. As of 2008 scholars and journalists believed that such reports were a small sign of opening up in the media.

Under Xi Jinping 
Since Xi Jinping became in 2012 the CCP general secretary, censorship has been significantly stepped up. During a visit to Chinese state media, Xi stated that "party-owned media must hold the family name of the party" and that the state media "must embody the party’s will, safeguard the party’s authority".  Under Xi, investigative journalism has been driven almost to extinction within China.

In 2018, as part of an overhaul of CCP and government bodies, the State Administration of Press, Publication, Radio, Film and Television (SAPPRFT) was renamed into the National Radio and Television Administration (NRTA) with its film, news media and publications being transferred to the Central Propaganda Department. Additionally, the control of China Central Television (CCTV, including its international edition, China Global Television), China National Radio (CNR) and China Radio International (CRI) were transferred to the newly established China Media Group (CMG) under the control of the Central Propaganda Department.

In 2019, All-China Journalists Association updated its code of ethics and mandatory exam requiring journalists to be guided by Xi Jinping Thought. In October 2021, the National Development and Reform Commission published rules restricting private capital in "news-gathering, editing, broadcasting, and distribution."

The CCP has used the COVID-19 pandemic as cover to further reduce media freedoms in China. According to Radio Free Asia, in December 2022, the National Press and Publication Administration issued a directive stating that in order to obtain credentials as a professional journalist, they must pass a national exam and "...must support the leadership of the Communist Party of China, conscientiously study, publicize and implement Xi Jinping’s thoughts on the new era of socialism with Chinese characteristics, resolutely implement the party’s theory, line, principles and policies, and adhere to the correct political direction and public opinion guidance."

Forms of media

Newspapers and journals 
During the early period of the Cultural Revolution, the number of newspapers declined while independent publications by mass political organizations grew. Mao encouraged these independent publications. According to China's National Bureau of Statistics, the number of newspapers dropped from 343 in 1965, to 49 in 1966, and then to a 20th-century low of 43 in 1967. At the same time, the number of publications by mass organizations such as Red Guards grew to an estimated number as high as 10,000.

The number of newspapers in mainland China has increased from 43—virtually all CCP newspapers—in 1968 to 382 in 1980 and more than 2,200 today. By one official estimate, there are now more than 7,000 magazines and journals in the country. The number of copies of daily and weekly newspapers and magazines in circulation grew fourfold between the mid-1960s and the mid-to-late 1980s, reaching 310 million by 1987.

These figures, moreover, underreport actual circulation, because many publishers use their own distribution networks rather than official dissemination channels and also deliberately understate figures to circumvent taxation. In addition, some 25,000 printing houses and hundreds of individual bookstores produce and sell unofficial material—mostly romance literature and pornography but also political and intellectual journals. China has many newspapers but the front runners are all State-run: the People's Daily, Beijing Daily, Guangming Daily and the Liberation Daily. The two primary news agencies in China are Xinhua News Agency and the China News Service. Xinhua was authorized to censor and edit the news of the foreign agencies in 2007. Some saw the power of Xinhua as making the press freedom weak and it allowed Xinhua to control the news market fully.

The diversity in mainland Chinese media is partly because most state media outlets no longer receive heavy subsidies from the government, and are expected to cover their expenses through commercial advertising. They can no longer merely serve as mouthpieces of the government, but also need to attract advertising through programming that people find attractive. While the government issues directives defining what can be published, it does not prevent, and in fact encourages outlets to compete for viewers and advertising.

Talk radio 
As of 1997 there were over 100 talk radio stations throughout the Shanghai area.

Internet 

The internet in China is heavily censored which limits public access to international media and non-sanctioned Chinese media. The main bodies for internet control are the Central Cyberspace Affairs Commission, a CCP body established in 2014, and the Cyberspace Administration of China, which is under the Cyberspace Affairs Commission. Additionally, the Ministry of Public Security's Cyber Police force is responsible for internal security, regulating online content, and investigation of Internet fraud, scams, pornography, separatism, and extremism.

Satellite receivers 
The administration of satellite receivers falls under the jurisdiction of the National Radio and Television Administration, which stipulates that foreign satellite televisions channels may only be received at high-end hotels and the homes and workplaces of foreigners. Foreign satellite televisions channels may seek approval to broadcast, but must be "friendly toward China." Foreign television news channels are, in theory, ineligible for distribution in China.

Home satellite dishes are officially illegal. Black market satellite dishes are nonetheless prolific, numbering well into the tens of millions. Chinese authorities engage in regular crackdowns to confiscate and dismantle illicit dishes, expressing concerns both over the potential for copyright infringements and over their ability receive "reactionary propaganda."

CCP internal media 

Much of the information collected by the Chinese mainstream media is published in neicans (internal, limited circulation reports prepared for the high-ranking government officials), not in the public outlets. He Qinglian documents in Media Control in China that there are many grades and types of internal documents [neibu wenjian 内部文件]. Many are restricted to a certain level of official – such as county level, provincial level or down to a certain level of official in a ministry. Some Chinese journalists, including Xinhua correspondents in foreign countries, write for both the mass media and the internal media. The level of classification is tied to the administrative levels of CCP and government in China. The higher the administrative level of the issuing office, generally the more secret the document is. In local government the issuing grades are province [sheng 省], region (or city directly subordinate to a province) [diqu 地区or shengzhixiashi 省直辖市] and county [xian 县]; grades within government organs are ministry [bu 部], bureau [ju 局] and office [chu 处]; in the military corps [jun 军], division [shi 师], and regiment [tuan 团]. The most authoritative documents are drafted by the Central Committee to convey instructions from CCP leaders. Documents with Chinese Communist Party Central Committee Document [Zhonggong Zhongyang Wenjian 中共中央文件] at the top in red letters are the most authoritative.

Foreign media and journalists 
In 2012, China banned Al Jazeera English and expelled their foreign staff due to an unfavorable report about forced labor. This was the first time since 1998 that China had expelled a major foreign media organization.

Reporting in China has become more difficult with the Chinese government increasingly interfering in the work of foreign journalists and discouraging Chinese citizens from giving interviews to the foreign press. The Chinese government increasingly uses restrictions and harassment of foreign journalists as a way to punish their home country or the home country of the media organization they report for. Since 2018 none of the 150 correspondents and bureau chiefs surveyed annually by the Foreign Correspondents’ Club of China (FCCC) have reported an improvement in their working conditions.

In 2020, the Chinese government expelled or forced the departure of at least 20 journalists. The Committee to Protect Journalists said of the behavior "It’s very disreputable for China, and it also shows that they have a lot to hide."

To foreign journalists working in China, the ruling CCP has threatened and punished them by failing to renew their credentials when they criticize the CCP's policies and human rights abuses. In March 2020, Chinese officials expelled almost all American journalists from China, accusing them and the US of trying to "impose American values" in China.

In August 2020, China detained Cheng Lei, an Australian journalist working for China Global Television Network, a Chinese state-run English television news channel, amid souring relations with Australia. Following her arrest the only other two Australian journalists in China were placed under exit bans and only managed to leave the country with their families after the Australian authorities interceded on their behalf.

In December 2020, Chinese authorities detained Haze Fan, who works for the Bloomberg News bureau in Beijing, on suspicion of "endangering national security".

In April 2021, BBC journalist John Sudworth and his family were forced to flee Mainland China for the island of Taiwan after personal attacks and disinformation from the Chinese government put them in danger. His wife is a journalist with the Irish RTÉ. The Chinese government had been angered by reporting he did on the internment camps in Xinjiang as well as a larger BBC story about forced labor in Xinjiang's cotton industry.

Communist Party control 
The media and communications industry in mainland China is controlled by the Central Propaganda Department of the CCP. The principal mechanism to force media outlets to comply with the CCP's requests is the vertically organized nomenklatura system of cadre appointments, and includes those in charge of the media industry. The CCP utilizes a wide variety of tools to maintain control over news reporting including "direct ownership, accreditation of journalists, harsh penalties for online criticism, and daily directives to media outlets and websites that guide coverage of breaking news stories." National Radio and Television Administration oversees the administration of state-owned enterprises involved in the radio and television, reporting directly to the Central Propaganda Department.

The Central Propaganda Department directly controls the China Media Group, which includes the China Central Television (including China Global Television), China National Radio (CNR) and China Radio International (CRI). The department also owns China Daily, as well as controlling many other media-related organizations such as the China International Publishing Group. China News Service, another large media outlet, is run by the United Front Work Department of the CCP. Xinhua News Agency is a ministry-level institution directly under the State Council, while People's Daily is the official newspaper of the CCP Central Committee.

The government uses a variety of approaches to retain some control over the media:
 It requires that newspapers be registered and attached to a government ministry, institute, research facility, labor group, or other State-sanctioned entity. Entrepreneurs cannot establish newspapers or magazines under their own names, although they reportedly have had some success in setting up research institutes and then creating publications attached to those bodies.
 It still occasionally jails or fines journalists for unfavorable reporting.
 It imposes other punishments when it deems that criticism has gone too far. For example, it shut down the magazine Future and Development in 1993 for publishing two articles calling for greater democracy in mainland China, and it forced the firing of the Beijing Youth Dailys editor for aggressively covering misdeeds and acts of poor judgment by party cadre.
 It continues to make clear that criticism of certain fundamental policies—such as those on PRC sovereignty over territories under Republic of China administration and Tibet and on Hong Kong's future in the wake of the transfer of Hong Kong sovereignty on July 1, 1997 —are off limits.
 It has set up numerous official journalists' associations—the largest is the All-China Journalist Federation, with more than 400,000 members—so that no single entity can develop major autonomous power.
 It holds weekly meetings with top newspaper editors to direct them as to what news items they want focused upon and which stories they want to go unreported. The controversial closure of the Freezing Point journal was generally unreported in mainland China due to government orders.
 It has maintained a system of uncertainty surrounding the boundaries of acceptable reporting, encouraging self-censorship. One media researcher has written that "it is the very arbitrariness of this control regime that cows most journalists into more conservative coverage."

International operations 

As of 2012 CCTV and Xinhua had greatly expanded international coverage and operations particularly in Africa.

In 2021, the United Kingdom expelled three Ministry of State Security (MSS) officers who had been posing as journalists with Chinese media agencies.

Chinese media in Africa

Already in 1948, the Xinhua News Agency established its first overseas bureau in sub-Saharan Africa. Initially, the Chinese media presence sought to promote Sino-African relations and "played an important role in assisting the government in developing diplomatic relations with newly independent African countries". Africa-China media relations became more sophisticated when the Forum on China–Africa Cooperation (FOCAC) was founded in 2000. In 2006 during the first FOCAC Summit in Beijing, the Chinese government presented its vision on media cooperation with Africa. Media exchange should "enhance mutual understanding and enable objective and balanced media coverage of each other". Through FOCAC, the Chinese influence on the African mediasphere has increased. In 2006, China Radio International (CRI) was established in Nairobi followed by the launch of the Chinese state-run CGTN Africa and the establishment of an African edition of China Daily in 2012. Additionally, China offers workshops and exchange programs to African journalists to introduce them to Chinese politics, culture, and economy as well as the Chinese media system. China does not only invest in African media outlets and journalists but also their digital infrastructure. The Chinese government grants financial and technical aid to African countries to expand their communications structure.

Scholars argue that through increased media presence and investments, the Chinese government tries to dominate the public sphere in Africa and expand its soft power. Research shows that Chinese news media in Africa portray China-Africa relations in an extremely positive light with little space for criticism. Hence, China tries to shape African narratives in its favor.  However, Chinese media influence in Africa is still relatively new and therefore the consequences of Chinese media engagement in Africa remain unclear. Despite China's efforts to support the African media infrastructure and promote China-Africa relations, African perceptions of China vary significantly and are complex. In general, a case study of South Africa shows that China is perceived as a powerful trading nation and economic investments result in a positive Chinese image. Yet, South African journalists are critical of Chinese media intervention and concerned about practices of Chinese journalism. Likewise, a study about Uganda reveals that journalists are worried about media cooperation with China because it poses a threat to the Freedom of the press. To conclude, the success of Chinese media influence in Africa depends on whether they can prevail in the African market and control the narrative in their favor.

Overseas Chinese media 

In 2001, the Jamestown Foundation reported that China was buying into Chinese-language media in the U.S., offering free content, and leveraging advertising dollars—all to manipulate coverage. The Guardian reported in 2018 that the China Watch newspaper supplement was being carried by The Telegraph along with other newspapers of record such as The New York Times, The Wall Street Journal and Le Figaro.

International rankings 

The Committee to Protect Journalists (CPJ) reported that China "continues to be the world's leading jailer of journalists," with 42 imprisoned journalists at the end of 2004, and accuses private companies, both foreign and domestic, of having been complacent toward or complicit with government censorship. Also, in their Worldwide Press Freedom Index 2007, Reporters Without Borders ranked China 163rd (or 7th from bottom) in terms of press freedom. Freedom House issued a report in 2006 claiming that the Internet is still closely monitored by the state, with access to websites and publications critical of the government being restricted, as well as foreign satellite television and radio broadcasts being censored.

In 2020, China was the world's largest jailor of journalists, according to Reporters Without Borders, with at least 118 detained.

See also 

Blocking of Wikipedia by the People's Republic of China
Censorship in the People's Republic of China
China National Radio
China Radio International
China News Service
Chinese Central Television
International Freedom of Expression eXchange
Internet freedom
Internet in the People's Republic of China
Digital divide in the People's Republic of China
Newspapers of China
People's Daily
China Daily
Global Times
Propaganda in the People's Republic of China
Sino-Japanese Journalist Exchange Agreement
Telecommunications in the People's Republic of China
Television in the People's Republic of China
TV Series (China)
Xinhua News Agency
List of documentary films about China

References

Further reading

 
 Huang, C. "Towards a broadloid press approach: The transformation of China's newspaper industry since the 2000s." Journalism 19 (2015): 1–16. online, With bibliography pages 27–33.
China Media Project at Journalism and Media Studies Centre, University of Hong Kong

 
China
China